Adenopea is a genus of worms belonging to the family Convolutidae.

Species:

Adenopea cenata 
Adenopea chuni 
Adenopea illardata 
Adenopea illardatus

References

Acoelomorphs